The comb-spined catfish (Cinetodus carinatus) is a species of catfish in the family Ariidae. It was described by Max Carl Wilhelm Weber in 1913, originally under the genus Arius. It is known to inhabit freshwater rivers in New Guinea. Its diet includes prawns, detritus, and a variety of terrestrial and aquatic insects and insect larvae.

References

Cinetodus
Fish described in 1913